Anam Imo (born 30 November 2000) is a Nigerian footballer who currently plays for Piteå IF in the Damallsvenskan. She also represents Nigeria national and under-20 football teams.

Career

Club career 
In March 2016, Imo scored the only goal for Nasarawa Amazons in their defeat to Nigeria under 17 team, in preparation for 2016 FIFA U-17 Women's World Cup.

International 
Imo was among the players invited to the Nigerian squad for the 2015 African Games by head coach, Christopher Danjuma. During camping, she scored several goals for the team. Ahead of the 2016 Africa Women Cup of Nations, Imo was in the 30-man provisional squad by Florence Omagbemi, but didn't make the final team of 23 players. At under-20 level, She was instrumental in the qualification of Nigeria for 2018 FIFA U-20 Women's World Cup, scoring in both legs of the final qualification game against South Africa.

She was named in the final squad list by coach Thomas Dennerby to the 2018 WAFU Women's Cup. At the tournament, she scored a goal against the Togolese women's team in the final group game. In April 2018, Imo was in the starting lineup in Nigerian defeat to France in a friendly game in Le Mans.

Accolades 
 2018 Nigeria Football Federation Awards – Woman Young Player of the Year (nominated)

References

External links 
 

2000 births
Living people
Women's association football forwards
Nigerian women's footballers
Nigeria women's international footballers
2019 FIFA Women's World Cup players
Damallsvenskan players
FC Rosengård players
Nigerian expatriate women's footballers
Nigerian expatriate sportspeople in Sweden
Expatriate women's footballers in Sweden
Nasarawa Amazons F.C. players
Sportspeople from Warri